Soft Black is an American, Brooklyn-based band, fronted by Vincent Cacchione. Much of Soft Black's lyrical content deals with Cacchione's dreams and nightmares. The band's sound was described as "a kind of bizarro-world Neil Young," as well as "[going] against the grain of [Brooklyn]’s more fashionable musical styles".

History
Soft Black began as a regular act at the Sidewalk Cafe in Manhattan, and became a staple of the Brooklyn underground music scene during the late 2000s, releasing three full-length albums between 2005 and 2009: Ramblin' Down a Dead End Street, Blue Gold and The Earth Is Black. The band's latest release, the EP We Scatter Light, was released in 2011.

Frontman Cacchione also is a member of the band Caged Animals, along with his wife Magali Francoise and sister Talya Cacchione, and has performed with Shilpa Ray.

Original guitarist Zachary Cole Smith later found fame with his own band DIIV, formed in 2011 (he also performed as the touring guitarist for Beach Fossils).

In June 2020, it was announced that Soft Black was working on a new album and released a single called Midas Tongue.

Members
Vincent Cacchione – vocals, guitar, synthesizer
Michael Stefanov – drums  
Patrick Curry – bass  
Chris Ibrahim – keyboards
Daniel Schlett – electric piano, piano, synthesizer  
Matthew Molnar – bass  
Michael Curry – bass
Nick Coleman – bass, drums, guitar  
Robert Durham – drums  
Christopher Pierce – drums  
Brian Amsterdam – guitar
Zachary Cole Smith – guitar
Turner Halsey – keyboards

Discography

Albums
 Ramblin' Down a Dead End Street (2005, Plays with Dolls Records)
 Blue Gold (2007, Plays with Dolls Records)
 The Earth Is Black (2009, Plays with Dolls Records)

Singles and EPs
 "Pearl With No String" / "Are You Still?" (2008, Plays with Dolls Records)
 We Scatter Light EP (2011, Plays with Dolls Records)

References

External links
Official website

Garage rock groups from New York (state)
Musical groups from Brooklyn
Psychedelic rock music groups from New York (state)
American shoegaze musical groups